Grouvellina planifrons is a species of ground beetle in the subfamily Rhysodinae. It was described by Fairmaire in 1893.

References

Grouvellina
Beetles described in 1893